Émile Natan (1906–1962) was a Romanian-born French film producer. He was the brother of Bernard Natan, the head of Pathé-Natan.

Selected filmography
 Accused, Stand Up! (1930)
 Little Lise (1930)
 Levy and Company (1930)
 Gloria (1931)
 All That's Not Worth Love (1931)
 The Dream (1931)
 Orange Blossom (1932)
 Beauty Spot (1932)
 The Wonderful Day (1932)
 The Levy Department Stores (1932)
 Once Upon a Time (1933)
 Toto (1933)
 Koenigsmark (1935)
 The King (1936)
 Tricoche and Cacolet (1938)
 After Love (1948)
 Imperial Violets (1952)
 The Beautiful Otero (1954)
 The Triumph of Michael Strogoff (1961)

References

Bibliography
 Andrew, Dudley. Mists of Regret: Culture and Sensibility in Classic French Film. Princeton University Press, 1995.

External links

1906 births
1962 deaths
Romanian film producers
French film producers
Romanian emigrants to France
Romanian Jews
Film people from Iași